Karimabad (also Romanized as Karīmābād) is a village in Hakimabad Rural District, in the Central District of Zarandieh County, Markazi Province, Iran. At the 2006 census, its population was 221, in 56 families.

References 

Populated places in Zarandieh County